There are over 400 R&D centers in Israel owned by multinational companies.

See also
Economy of Israel
IBM Israel
List of Israeli companies quoted on the Nasdaq
Science and technology in Israel
Silicon Wadi

References

Multinationals with research and development centres in Israel
Multinationals with research and development centres in Israel
Research and development in Israel